Mirpur, officially known as New Mirpur City, is the capital of Mirpur district located in Azad Kashmir, Pakistan. It is the second largest city of Azad Kashmir and 74th largest city in Pakistan.

A significant portion of the population from the district, the Mirpuri diaspora, migrated to the United Kingdom in the mid-to-late 1950s and in the early 1960s, mostly to West Yorkshire, East and West Midlands, Birmingham, Luton, Peterborough, Derby and East London. Mirpur is thus sometimes known as "Little England". Many British products are found, and many shops in the city accept the pound sterling.

The city itself has gone through a process of modernization, but most of the surrounding area relies on agriculture.

History 
The city of Mirpur itself was founded in around 1640 AD or 1050AH by the Ghakhar chief Miran Shah Ghazi. The Imperial Gazetteer of India Provincial Series Kashmir and Jammu (1909) reports that "it is said to have been founded by Miran Shah Ghazi and Sultan Fateh Khan". An alternate view is that the city was founded by Mira Shah Gazi and Gosain Bodhpuri, both regarded as saints. The word 'Mir' was taken from the name of the former and 'Pur’ from the latter.

The area that is now Mirpur has been historically associated with Pothohar region of Northern Punjab, though the modern demarcation of Pothohar devised by the British excludes Mirpur, by using the Jhelum river as its eastern boundary. By the end of the 18th century, Gakhar power in Pothohar had declined. Mirpur had become part of Chibb, which ruled the state of Khari Khariyali with its capital at Mangla Fort. With the rise of the Sikh power in the Punjab, Maharaja Ranjit Singh established his supremacy and set his eyes on the Chibh states of Bhimber and Khari Khariyali. In 1810, a force was sent against Raja Sultan Khan of Bhimber and was met with fierce resistance. However, in 1812 another Sikh army under prince Kharak Singh defeated Sultan Khan, and the Bhimber state was annexed as Jagir of Kharak Singh. Around the same time, Ranjit Singh acquired Gujrat and invaded Khari Khariyali, then ruled by Raja Umar Khan. Raja Umar Khan made peace with Ranjit Singh; but before a settlement could be made, he died, and the state and Mirpur became part of Ranjit Singh's territories.

In 1808, Ranjit Singh annexed Jammu state, which was already a tributary since 1780, and in 1820 awarded Jammu to his commander Gulab Singh, who hailed from Jammu and had been under the service of Ranjit Singh for the past eight years. Between 1831 and 1839 Ranjit Singh bestowed on Gulab Singh the royalty of the salt mines in northern Punjab, and the northern Punjab towns including Bhera, Jhelum, Rohtas and Gujrat. Gulab Singh kept on expanding his kingdom, and in 1840 Baltistan was made subject to Jammu while Gilgit fell to a Sikh force from Kashmir in 1842. The state of Kashmir was annexed by Ranjit Singh in 1819. However, the rebellion in Hazara in the beginning of 1846 compelled the country to be transferred to Raja Gulab Singh of Jammu as well.

Ranjit Singh had given Poonch, Mirpur and Bhimber as a Jagir to Gulab Singh's younger brother Dhian Singh. However, in 1843 Dhian Singh died and Gulab Singh considered these areas now part of his territory. Though he wasn't able to establish full control due to resistances.

As an aftermath of the First Anglo-Sikh War and the Treaty of Lahore, The Treaty of Amritsar was signed between the British East India company and Raja Gulab Singh of Jammu on March 16, 1846. The British Government sold Kashmir to the Raja of Jammu for 75 lakhs Nanak Shahi Rupees. This treaty transferred him all the hill states between Ravi and Indus. The transfer included Kashmir, Hazara and the southern hill states including the former Khari Khariyali, thus sealing the fate of Mirpur with the new state of Jammu and Kashmir.

Early Mirpur
Since Mirpur lies in between where the Jhelum River meets the heavily forested foothills of the Pir Panjal mountains and above the plains of the largely treeless Punjab, it was an ideal spot for the construction of the boats used to carry goods from the Himalayas down the five rivers of the Punjab to the Indus River and onto the seaports in the Indus delta. Traders have been operating from there across the Indian Ocean for over three thousand years. Most of the crew on the boats trading up and down the Punjab and Indus River system were drawn from Mirpur, as training as a boat-builder was a necessary prerequisite for becoming a boatman.

British Dominion
During the modern period of the Dogra principality, a British dominion, the thriving river trade diminished due to the construction of railway lines from Bombay and Karachi into the interior of the Punjab. Moving goods by modern rail lines was both cheaper and quicker, and hundreds of Mirpuri boatmen found themselves out of a job.

Independence and War
The city was part of the princely state of Jammu and Kashmir led by Maharaja Hari Singh, which chose to remain independent after the Partition of India. During the Indo-Pakistani War of 1947–1948 Mirpur was captured by the tribal forces on 25 November 1947 and became part of Azad Kashmir. It was the central location of the Mirpur Massacre in November 1947.

Geography 
It is the headquarters of Mirpur District, which has two subdivisions: Mirpur and Dadyal. Mirpur is now one of the largest city of Azad Kashmir. The building of the new city in late 1960s paved the way for New Mirpur, situated on the bank of Mangla Lake. The project of four-star hotel PC has been completed. The government is planning to make the second rotating hotel of Pakistan in Mirpur, Azad Kashmir.

In fact, the remains of the old city (Old Mirpur) are under the waters of the Mangla Lake, bit during the colder months of March and April, the water level recedes to such an extent that one can travel on motorcycle on the old Mirpur, road which still exists. The holy shrines of Syed Abdul Karim and Meeran Shah Ghazi then become visible and so do the remnants of a Sikh gurdwara as well as a Hindu Mandir, possibly dedicated to the "Mangla Mata" (Mangla mother goddess). The remains of old houses, water wells and graveyards reappear as well.

People from surrounding areas visit old Mirpur to pay homage to their ancient land on which they lived and pray on the graveyards of their loved ones. Urs Mubarak of Meeran Shah and Syed Abdul Kareem are also arranged in Old Mirpur.

The remains of Old Mirpur depict a silhouette of pre-Independence city, when many faiths coexisted. However, after division of the State of Jammu Kashmir, the non-Muslim community (Hindus, Buddhists and Sikhs) fled to Jammu.

New Mirpur was well planned, and modern buildings and ample roads serve each part of city. The affluence from emigration mainly to the UK is reflected by the structure and grandiose of the residential houses. There are telltale signs of inward investment by the expatriate community living in the United Kingdom, Europe, North America and the Middle East. There are a number of good hotels, restaurants, shopping malls and other urban facilities.

Climate
Mirpur has a humid subtropical climate. Since it is in the extreme south of Jammu and Kashmir, the city has a climate that is extremely hot during summer, making it very similar to the Pakistani areas of Jehlum and Gujar Khan. Mirpur is the breadbasket of Azad Jammu and Kashmir and has a climate similar to that of the neighbouring Potohar in Punjab.

Industry
The government of Azad Jammu and Kashmir has successfully developed Mirpur industrially and promoted private investment in a diverse economy: foam, polypropylene, synthetic yarn, motorbikes and scooter, textile, vegetable oil (ghee), wood and sawmills, soap, cosmetics, marble, ready-made garments, matches and rosin, turpentine. The economy of Mirpur generated economy of Azad Kashmir. However, much of the infrastructure still needs improvement so that high-quality products can be obtained.

As part of the relief/compensation package in the wake of Mangla Dam, a new city is being developed along the southeastern outskirts of Mirpur, with the main city of Mirpur being doubled. Much construction is occurring around the whole district by Pakistani and Chinese contractors, raising the dam. Four towns in the district have been planned near the new city to resettle the population affected by the project.

Education 
English is common in educational institutes. Previously, the University of Azad Jammu & Kashmir was the only institution for higher studies but there have been significant changes in the educational infrastructure. The Mirpur University of Science and Technology (MUST), the Akson College of Health Science and the Mohtarma Benazir Bhutto Shaheed Medical College have been formed.

The AJK Board of Intermediate and Secondary Education, Mirpur is responsible for the studies at lower levels. In addition to the state-run schools and colleges, Mirpur has a well-developed private sector providing the education to all sections of the society:

Other notable colleges and schools include:

 The City School
 Mohi ud Din Islamic Institute of Pharmaceutical Sciences
 Mohi-ud-Din Islamic Medical College
 Punjab College, Mirpur

Sport 

Football, cricket and volleyball are popular in Mirpur. Mirpur has a cricket stadium, Quaid-e-Azam Stadium.

There are registered sports clubs: Al-Fatah Cricket Club is one of the top clubs in the city which is among the top 10 Clubs of Pakistan. Other clubs include Eagle star Cricket Club, South Asia Cricket Club. Notable cricketers include Zaman Khan who plays for Lahore Qalandars in Pakistan Super League, Hassan Raza who has represented Pakistan in U-19 world Cup. He is currently representing Northerns in Quaid Azam Trophy and Shadab Khan who is also playing for Northerns in Quiad Azam Trophy. 

Pilot Football Club, Youth Football Club and Kashmir National FC.The district football team of Mirpur take part in the All Azad Jammu and Kashmir football championships.

Transport
CNG auto rickshaws are very  popular mode of transport for short routes within the city. The city's transport system links it to a number of destinations in Azad Kashmir notably Bhimber, Jatlan, Chakswari, Dadyal, Kotli and Khoi Ratta and to major cities in Pakistan as well as including services to Gujrat, Jhelum, Kharian, Gujranwala, Lahore and Rawalpindi.
There is no railway station in Mirpur. The closest station is in Dina. The promise of a rail extension to Mirpur has not been fulfilled.

Islamabad Airport, which services the Mirpur region, is 130 km away. Sialkot International Airport is 110 kilometres away. An international airport has been planned. The location of the airport has not been determined, but possible locations near Mirpur are Mangla, Jatlan and Bhalwhara. In August 2013, the National Assembly and the prime minister approved the airport. It was determined that the airport would be constructed in two years after funding.

Demographics
According to the 2017 census, Mirpur had a population of 124,352. Mirpur's original population comprises different tribes similar to that of Punjab. However, since 1947, Pahari people emigrated from the neighbouring Rajouri and Poonch districts of the Indian administered Jammu and Kashmir. The bulk of the Mirpuri diaspora resides in England.

Hindu and Sikh communities

Before the Kashmir War in 1947, the Mirpur District had about 75,000 Hindu and Sikhs, who made the majority population of Mirpur city and amounted upto 20 percent of the population of the district. A great majority of them lived in the principal towns of Mirpur, Kotli and Bhimber. Many Hindu and Sikh refugees from the Potohar region of Northern Punjab had taken refuge in Mirpur town, causing the non-Muslim population to increase by 25,000. On 25 November 1947, during the 1947 Jammu massacres tribesmen and Pakistani military members attacked and seized the city. Of the minority population, only about 2,500 Hindus or Sikhs escaped to the Jammu and Kashmir along with the State Forces. The remainder were marched to Alibeg, where a gurdwara was converted into a prison camp, but the raiders killed 20,000 of the captives along the way and abducted 5,000 women. Only about 5,000 made it to Alibeg, but they continued to be killed at a gradual pace by the captors. In March 1948, the ICRC rescued 1,600 of the survivors from Alibeg, who were resettled to Jammu and other areas of India.

Landmarks
There are the following places of interest:
Khari Sharif Darbar
Mangla Dam
Mangla Fort
Ramkot Fort

Notable people

 Nazir Ahmed, Baron Ahmed – former Member of the British House of Lords
 Mian Muhammad Bakhsh – Sufi saint, Poet
 Sultan Mehmood Chaudhry – politician, President of Azad Kashmir since  2021
 Zaman Khan – cricketer
 Chaudhry Abdul Majid – politician who served as the Prime Minister of Azad Jammu and Kashmir from 2011 to 2016
 Moeed Pirzada – journalist and TV anchor
 Afaq Raheem – first-class Pakistani cricketer
 Baba Shadi Shaheed  – Sufi saint 
 Jamil Rahmat Vance – Retired Two Star General of Pakistan Army
 Krishan Dev Sethi- Social Leader,Political Leader,Activist for Abolition of Interest based lending in Jammu & Kashmir
 Mohammad Yasin MP – British Member of Parliament for Bedford

Friendship cities
Mirpur has friendly relations with:
 Birmingham, England, United Kingdom
 Bradford, England, United Kingdom

 London, England, United Kingdom

See also
British Mirpuri community
Chowk Shaheedan
Maqbool Butt
Mirpur Development Authority (MDA)
 Bissat

Notes

References

Bibliography

External links 
Government of Azad Jammu and Kashmir
BBC News: Inside Pakistan's 'Little Britain'

Mirpur, Pakistan
Populated places in Mirpur District